The FC Basel 1926–27 season was their thirty fourth season since the club's foundation on 15 November 1893. The club's new chairman was Franz Rinderer. It was Rinderer's third period as chairman. He took over the presidency from Carl Burkhardt at the AGM. FC Basel played their home games in the Landhof in the district Wettstein in Kleinbasel.

Overview 
Karl Bielser was team captain for the second season in a row and as captain he led the team trainings and was responsible for the line-ups. Basel played a total of 32 matches in their 1926–27 season. 16 of these were in the domestic league, one was in the Swiss Cup and 15 were friendly matches. Of these 15 friendlies only two were played at home in the Landhof and 13 were away games, six in Switzerland, five in France and two un Germany. Eight of these games were won, one was drawn and six ended with a defeat. The team scored 33 goals in these friendlies, but conceded 37.

An interesting match among these friendlies this season, was the away game against Bayern Munich. Not because of the result, because Basel were defeated 0–10, but because of the goalscorer Josef Pöttinger. Pöttinger was not only for his club, but also for the German national team, one of the most effective goal scorers of his time. On the 3 April 1927, as Basel played in Munich, Pöttinger scored a "perfect" hat-trick within the first 12 minutes (3', 10', 12') of the match and in the second half he scored five consecutive goals (52', 60', 62', 68', 83').

As in the previous year, this's season the Serie A was divided into three regional groups, each group with nine teams. Basel were allocated to the Central group together with local clubs Concordia Basel, Nordstern Basel and Old Boys Basel. The other teams allocated to this group were Young Boys Bern, FC Bern, Aarau, Grenchen and Solothurn. The teams that won each group continue to the finals and the last placed teams in the groups had to play a barrage against relegation. FC Basel played a mediocre season, winning eight matches, drawing three and suffering five defeats, scoring 29 goals and conceding 26. With 19 points they ended the season in fourth position, six points behind group winners Nordstern and the Young Boys, both of whom were level on points. Nordstern won the play-off 1–0 and advanced to the finals. Grasshopper Club won the championship, Nordstern were runner-up and Biel-Bienne were third. Aarau were the bottom placed team and won the promotion/relegation play-off against FC Madretsch.

In the round of 64 in the Swiss Cup Basel were drawn against Old Boys, but were eliminated in this round because they lost the match 0–2. Grasshopper Club won the cup, winning the final 3–1 against Young Fellows Zürich.

Players 
Squad members

.

Left the squad

Results 
Legend

Friendly matches

Pre- and mid-season

Winter break to end of season

Serie A

Central Group results

Central Group table

Swiss Cup

See also 
 History of FC Basel
 List of FC Basel players
 List of FC Basel seasons

References

Sources 
 Rotblau: Jahrbuch Saison 2014/2015. Publisher: FC Basel Marketing AG. 
 Die ersten 125 Jahre. Publisher: Josef Zindel im Friedrich Reinhardt Verlag, Basel. 
 FCB team 1925–26 at fcb-archiv.ch
 Switzerland 1926-27 at RSSSF

External links
 FC Basel official site

FC Basel seasons
Basel